Tanner hall (born March 18, 2002) is an American college baseball pitcher for the Southern Miss Golden Eagles.

Amateur career
Hall grew up in Zachary, Louisiana and attended Zachary High School, where he played baseball and soccer.

Hall made 18 appearances with one start during his freshman season at Southern Miss and went 1-1 with a 5.02 ERA. As a sophomore, he went  9-3 record with a 2.81 ERA and 146 strikeouts against 14 walks over 109 innings pitched. Hall was named the Conference USA Pitcher of the Year and won the C Spire Ferriss Trophy as the top collegiate baseball player in the State of Mississippi. He was also a consensus All-America selection.

References

External links

Southern Miss Golden Eagles bio

Living people
Baseball players from Louisiana
Baseball pitchers
Southern Miss Golden Eagles baseball players
All-American college baseball players
People from Zachary, Louisiana
2002 births
Sportspeople from East Baton Rouge Parish, Louisiana